Yukon is one of Canada's territories, and has established several territorial symbols.

Official symbols

Great Seal

Like Nunavut, Yukon does not have an official Great Seal.

References

Territorial symbols of Yukon
Yukon
Symbols
Canadian provincial and territorial symbols